Studied by Douglas Aircraft Company in 1965, this rocket consisted of a whole Saturn IB with 4 strap-on SRBs that have flown on the Titan 3E interplanetary missile carriers. All components of the vehicle have flown, but not together for this concept.

References 

Lowther, Scott, Saturn: Development, Details, Derivatives and Descendants, Work in progress. Available chapters may be ordered directly from Scott Lowther at web site indicated. Accessed at: https://web.archive.org/web/20070521083808/http://www.webcreations.com/ptm.

Saturn (rocket family)